Shanta Dutta is an Indian researcher on Enteric diseases and currently the director of National Institute of Cholera and Enteric Diseases (ICMR-NICED).  She has over 25 years of research experience on Enteric diseases. She has been elected as a Fellow of West Bengal Academy of Science and Technology & National Academy of Sciences, India

Education 
Shanta Dutta completed her MBBS in 1986 from the University of Calcutta. In 1992 she completed her MD studies focusing on Medical Microbiology from Mangalore University, Karnataka. In 2006, she obtained a Ph.D. in Medical Science from Kyushu University, Japan.

Career 
Dutta joined Indian Council of Medical Research (ICMR) on 3 August 1994 as Senior Research Officer. On 12 July 2016 she has been selected as the Director & Scientist G at the National Institute of Cholera and Enteric Diseases, Kolkata. She has published more than 200 original research articles, review articles in peer reviewed journals and several book chapters.

Personal life 
On 30 June 2020, Shanta Dutta was tested positive with Coronavirus disease. She was also suffering from pneumonia at that time and was admitted to hospital. She recovered and was discharged from the hospital in the first week of July.

References 

Indian microbiologists
University of Calcutta alumni
Kyushu University alumni
Scientists from Kolkata
Year of birth missing (living people)
Living people